Ceyda Sungur, also known as Kırmızılı Kadın (English: Woman in Red), is a Turkish academician and activist.

Life 
She was born in 1986. After completing her bachelor's degree on urban planning, she has started to work as a research assistant at the Istanbul Technical University.

Case of police brutality 
In May 2013, she participated the Gezi Park protests in İstanbul as rioter and volunteer first-aider. During the demonstrations, she was attacked by a police officer named Fatih Zengin. When a photo journalist from the Reuters—Osman Orsal—photographed the moment that Sungur was subject of the police brutality, a huge reaction was sparked both in Turkish and international public. Following she became a symbol to the protests. Zengin was sued by prosecutors who pressed for a three-year prison sentence advertently for using disproportionate force against civilians.  Sungur pleaded at the court that "if the accused had a weapon, he would have kill me like another police officer who had murdered Ethem Sarısülük". After a year, the trial was concluded and the Zengnin were sentenced to plant 600 saplings in consequence of that he sprayed tear gas at close range and abused his power. Moreover, another lawsuit had filed against Sungur on the charge of "inciting the public to disobey the law" was also dismissed.

In popular culture

Books 
 Turkish-Italian film director Ferzan Özpetek wrote a book named "İstanbul Kırmızısı" by inspiring from the discources and image of the "Woman in Red".
 Gürsel Öncü, who had been current editor of the "Tarih" journal that was closed during the Gezi protests, wrote the book "Yaşarken Yazılan Tarih" and a picture of Ceyda Sungur & the police officer was used as the cover image.

Magazines 
 Brazil centered culture journal "Piauí" gave place an illustration describing the "Woman in Red" holding the flag of Brazil as the cover image of the July 2013 issue in response to the public uprisings in Brazil at the same time with the Gezi protests. Also, the "#direngezi" hashtag at bottom of the cover.
 Turkey based humour magazine "Penguen" depicted the "Woman in Red" spraying pepper gas towards a police officer as the cover image of the July 2013 issue and released a caption that "The demonstrators attacked the police!". This work was shown among the 'most creative humor magazine covers of 2013'.

References 

Living people
1986 births
Turkish activists
Academic staff of Istanbul Technical University
Gezi Park protests
Police brutality in Turkey